Tonina Torrielli (born 22 March 1934) is an Italian singer.

In 1956, she represented Italy in the first Eurovision Song Contest with the song "Amami se vuoi", alongside Franca Raimondi with "Aprite le finestre". It is unknown what position the song finished, since the vote was secret and only the winning song was announced.

Selected songs
 "Amami se vuoi" (1956)
 "L'amore" (1958)

External links
 

1934 births
Living people
People from Serravalle Scrivia
Italian women singers
Eurovision Song Contest entrants for Italy
Eurovision Song Contest entrants of 1956